Agamemnon Gilis (born 1891, date of death unknown) was a Greek football player who played for the clubs Apollon in Smyrna, and later for Panionios in Athens, following the Greco-Turkish war between 1919 and 1922. He was a member of the national team for the 1920 Olympic Games in Antwerp.

References

External links
 

1891 births
Year of death unknown
Greek footballers
Footballers at the 1920 Summer Olympics
Olympic footballers of Greece
Association football defenders